Klingspor is a Swedish surname and may refer to:

 Agneta Klingspor (1946–2022), Swedish author
 Alexander Klingspor (born 1977), Swedish painter and sculptor
 Count Wilhelm Mauritz Klingspor (1744–1814), Swedish noble military officer
 Klingspor Museum, Offenbach, Germany
 Klingspor Type Foundry, Germany

See also
 Wilhelm Klingspor-Schrift, a typeface 

 Swedish-language surnames